Raheela Anwar (born 20 February 1956) is a Pakistani politician who was a Member of the Provincial Assembly of the Punjab, from May 2013 to May 2018.

Early life and education
She was born on 20 February 1956 in Jhelum.

She has completed matriculation level education from Presentation Convent High School Jhelum.

Political career

She was elected to the Provincial Assembly of the Punjab as a candidate of Pakistan Tehreek-e-Insaf on a reserved seat for women in 2013 Pakistani general election.

References

Living people
Women members of the Provincial Assembly of the Punjab
Punjab MPAs 2013–2018
1956 births
Pakistan Tehreek-e-Insaf politicians
21st-century Pakistani women politicians